Eighter Island is a small island and a townland off the coast of County Donegal, Ireland. The closest town on the mainland is Burtonport.

Geography
The island is located around one km east of Arranmore and North-West of Inishcoo, another small island divided by narrow channels from Rutland and the mainland. A footbridge connects the two islets, both known for pleasant sandbeaches.
The inner part of Eighter Island is mainly rocky and the most convenient landing sites are in the southern part of it.

History
A small community used to live on Eighter Island in the first part of the 20th century, but today the island is uninhabited.
Some of the old houses are used as holiday homes, mostly concentrated in the south-eastern part of the island.

See also

 List of islands of Ireland

References

External links

 "Eighter Island Townland, Co. Donegal" at townlands.ie

Islands of County Donegal
Townlands of County Donegal
Uninhabited islands of Ireland